Ingleside is an unincorporated community in Mercer County, West Virginia, United States. Ingleside is located on Interstate 77 and West Virginia Route 112 and is south of Princeton.

References

Unincorporated communities in Mercer County, West Virginia
Unincorporated communities in West Virginia